Lee Konitz Meets Jimmy Giuffre is an album by American jazz saxophonist Lee Konitz and saxophonist, composer and arranger Jimmy Giuffre which was released on the Verve label in 1959.

Critical reception

Scott Yanow of Allmusic states that Giuffre's "arrangements for five saxes (including the great tenor Warne Marsh) and a trio led by pianist Bill Evans are sometimes equally influenced by classical music and bop".

Track listing 
 "Palo Alto" (Lee Konitz) – 3:06
 "Darn That Dream" (Jimmy Van Heusen, Eddie DeLange) – 1:53
 "When Your Lover Has Gone" (Einar Aaron Swan) – 4:59		
 "Cork 'N Bib" (Konitz) – 9:42		
 "Somp'm Outa' Nothin'" (Jimmy Giuffre) – 4:20
 "Someone to Watch over Me" (George Gershwin, Ira Gershwin) – 3:30
 "Uncharted" (Giuffre) – 3:53
 "Moonlight in Vermont" (Karl Suessdorf, John Blackburn) – 3:53	
 "The Song Is You" (Jerome Kern, Oscar Hammerstein II) – 5:01

Personnel 
Lee Konitz – alto saxophone
Jimmy Giuffre – baritone saxophone, arranger
Hal McKusick – alto saxophone
Ted Brown, Warne Marsh – tenor saxophone
Bill Evans – piano
Buddy Clark – bass
Ronnie Free – drums

References 

Lee Konitz albums
Jimmy Giuffre albums
1959 albums
Verve Records albums